A chemo-protective agent is any drug that helps to reduce the side- effects of chemotherapy. These agents protect specific body parts from the harmful anti-cancer treatments that could potentially cause permanent damage to important bodily tissues. Chemo-protective agents have only recently been introduced as a factor involved with chemotherapy with the intent to assist those cancer patients that require treatment, which as an end result, improves the patients' quality of life. There have been a few studies on these agents though most of them come to the same conclusion, so what is known about them isn't very broad. Information including examples, risks, and more are the most researched aspects of Chemo protective agents. 

Examples include: 
 Amifostine, approved by the FDA in 1995, which helps prevent kidney damage in patients undergoing cisplatin and carboplatin chemotherapy
 Mesna, approved by the FDA in 1988, which helps prevent hemorrhagic cystitis (bladder bleeding) in patients undergoing cyclophosphamide or ifosfamide chemotherapy
 Dexrazoxane, approved by the FDA in 1995, which helps prevent heart problems in patients undergoing doxorubicin chemotherapy

Risks 

Chemo-protective agents are common drugs and like many other drugs, may have side effects of their own. Each agent has different side effects though the most common consist of dizziness, sleepiness, nausea, fever, etc. It is important to discuss the side effects of these drugs with a doctor before using them to combat any type of chemotherapy to insure the drug will benefit each and every patient.

References

External links 
 Chemoprotective entry in the public domain NCI Dictionary of Cancer Terms

Antineoplastic drugs